Abazar may refer to:

 Abazar, Ardabil
 Abazar, Khuzestan

See also
 Abizar, also called Abu Zarr, a companion of Muhammad and a Shi'a of Ali
 Abuzar